= Louis Marianne =

French professional football manager

Personal information
- Place of birth: France

Managerial career
- Years: Team
- 1983–1985: Martinique
- 2014–2017: Martinique

Louis Marianne is a French professional football manager.

In 1983–1985 he was a coach of the Martinique national football team with Marcel Pujar. Since 2014 he again coached the Martinique national football team.
